Jesse Carere (born June 6, 1993) is a Canadian actor. He is best known for playing Ofe, a recurring character in the MTV series Finding Carter. He is also known for his role as Adam Jones in the Netflix / City series Between. Carere also played Chris Collins in the MTV version of Skins and has appeared in various independent films.

Personal life
Carere was born and raised in Woodbridge, Ontario, in the city of Vaughan. His parents are Milva and Vince Carere, and he is the eldest of four children. He loves cinema and his favorite hobby is watching a good movie. His favorite actors are Johnny Depp, Leonardo DiCaprio, Matt Damon, and Robert Downey Jr. Jesse attended St. Michael's College School in downtown Toronto.

Jesse dropped out of university to pursue acting full-time, saying college was not for him.

Career
Jesse's first acting role was in a short called Money in 2006. Jesse's interest in acting led to his very first main role as Chris in MTV's version of Skins in 2011. For season 2 of Between Jesse was promoted to Managing Director, adding a behind-the-scenes role to his acting role in front of the camera.

Film

Television

Shorts

Awards and nominations

References

External links
 

1993 births
21st-century Canadian male actors
Canadian male film actors
Canadian male television actors
Living people
People from Vaughan
Male actors from Toronto
Canadian people of Italian descent